Save Me is a 2017 South Korean television series starring Ok Taec-yeon, Seo Yea-ji, Jo Sung-ha, and Woo Do-hwan. Serving as the first television series from producer Lee Jae-moon's company Hidden Sequence, it aired on OCN from August 5 to September 24, 2017 for 16 episodes. This drama series is based on the popular Daum webcomic Out of the World (세상 밖으로) by Jo Geum-san.

Synopsis
Im Sang-mi and her family move from Seoul to the suburb of Muji County, after her father's business fails.

The religious cult Goseonwon has most of the county in its grasp, with a large number of followers. The cult disguises itself as a peaceful church but dark secrets, torture, violence and murder lurk underneath; with even mischievously darker intentions that deceive their most devoted followers.

Sang-mi's twin brother Sang-jin, who has limping since birth, is mercilessly bullied and assaulted at school. Because he can take such abuse no longer, he commits suicide by jumping off the school building. This tears Sang-mi's family apart.
Sang Mi's mother soon loses her sanity, causing Sang Mi's hatred for the religious cult who she blames for her mother's poor condition.

Taking advantage of their fragile state, the cult's leader lures her parents into Goseonwon. Despite Sang-Mi's repeated objections to something wrong with the cult, her father is fully brainwashed. With him in the clutches of the cult and her mother mentally unstable, Sang-mi is trapped and unable to escape.

Three years later, her classmate Han Sang-hwan, the son of the county chief who is now a law student, and his two friends Jung-hoon and Man-hee have a chance encounter with Sang-mi. She whispers to them, "Save me." Sang-hwan, determined to right the wrongs of his past, grows determined to save her and expose the cult to the county. He is joined by his third friend and convicted murderer Dong-chul, and both Jung-hoon and Man-hee in his mission, unaware that the cult is just the tip of the iceberg. Using their abilities, the characters try to outwit each other in the tug of war over Sang-mi.

Cast

Main
 Ok Taec-yeon as Han Sang-hwan- the only son of a corrupt politician, who tries to save Sang-mi from the cult. Having power and wealth, he uses it to break into the cult but finds a darker secret lurking inside it.
 Seo Yea-ji as Im Sang-mi- a new girl whose family moved from Seoul to Daegu after her father's business gone bankrupt. Her twin brother Sang-jin committed suicide, and the incident causes her mother to go crazy. Her father started to get deeply involved in a cult as he was obscured by the vision of getting his family on the Boat of Salvation to reunite with his deceased son. She desperately tried to escape the hell for three years, until she met again with Han Sang-hwan and his gang, silently pleading for him to save her.
 Jo Sung-ha as Baek Jung-ki- the charismatic leader of the cult, whose kind demeanor and caring attitude is shadowed by violent and manipulative behavior. He is called the Spiritual Father.
 Woo Do-hwan as Suk Dong-chul- the friend of Sang-hwan, who has the most fighting skills out of the whole group. He was incarcerated for three years after Sang-hwan refused to testify for an accident he was involved in, and their relationship had become strained since ever. However, after his release from jail, he decided to mend their relationship and started to work together to save Sang-mi. He breaks into the cult to save Sang-mi, disguised as a son of a rich businessman.

Supporting

Hillbilly Quartet
 Lee David as Woo Jung-hoon- the best friend of Sang Hwan and Dong chul, who's in debt and becomes a Streamer
  as Choi Man-hee- the smart friend of Sang Hwan and Dong Chul, who is soft and caring. He helps them out multiple times using his deductive abilities and selfless nature.

Sang-mi's family
  as Im Joo-ho, Sang-mi's father. After the demise of his son, he joined the cult as he strongly believed that his family will be reunited on the Ship of Salvation.
 Yoon Yoo-sun as Kim Bo-eun, Sang-mi's mother. She became mentally unstable after Sang-jin's death, and was locked in a sanitarium owned by the cult. She was used as a tool to threaten Sang-mi to give up on her attempt to escape.
 Jang Yoo-sang as Im Sang-jin, Sang-mi's twin brother who had been limping since his birth. He suffered from depression and anxiety as a result of getting bullied by his friends due to his disability. He eventually decided to commit suicide by jumping off the roof of their school.

People at Goosunwon
 Park Ji-young as Kang Eun-shil- a member of Goosunwon, who stays loyal to Jung-ki, but secretly vies to take control of Goonsunwon
 Jo Jae-yoon as Jo Wan-tae- the second in command at Goosunwon, who is extremely loyal to Jung-ki and takes advantage of the rich. 
  as Jo Wan-deok- the burly bodyguard of Jung-ki and Wan-tae's brother, whose obese stature gives him immense strength

People in Muji
 Son Byung-ho as Han Yong-min- the father of Sang-hwan and the governor of Muji. He's corrupt and uses the cult as an advantage point to stay in power
  as Chae Min-hwa- mother of Sang-Hwan
 Jang Hyuk-jin as Lee Kang-soo- a gang member and former cop
 Kim Kwang-kyu as Woo Choon-kil- a cop who has ties with the cult, and later joins it
 Go Jun as Cha Joon-goo- a thug without a gang, who gets involved in the cult and later rises to the ranks of "Holy Gatekeeper", alongside Dong-chul
  as Lee Ji-hee, the aide of Han Yong-Min, with whom she has an affair.
  as Madame Tudari- Secretary of Jang-ki
  as Choi Kyung-hye- Woo Choon-kil's cop partner, who wants to save people but is unable to do so
 Jeon Yeo-been as Hong So-rin- an undercover journalist in Guweonson, later becoming the right-hand of Sang-Mi.
 Lee Jae-joon as Dae-shik- son of a cult member, member of a gang and co-worker of Dong-Chul
  as Lee Byung-suk

Extended

 Lee Joon-gyu as Chil-goo
 Jung Jae-kwang as Lee Eun-sung	
  as Elderly Man
  as Dong-cheol's father
  as Dong-cheol's grandmother
 Jung Joon-won as Jung-goo
  as Lee Byung-seok's father
 Min Kyung-ok as Jung-goo's grandmother
 Ahn Min-young as Devotee
 Noh Eun-jung as Devotee
 Jong Seok as Iljin 1
 Lee Seung-hyub as Iljin 2
 Jang Won as Iljin 3
 Nam Hyun-jung as Iljin 4
 Jung Kang-hee as Gochujang
 Son Byung-wook as Pil-soo
 Yoo Yeon as Homeroom teacher
 Kim Ha-yeon as Devotee
 Kim Jin-hee as Devotee
 Im Ho-joon as Devotee
 Jwa Chae-won as Devotee
 Kim Doo-eun as Devotee
  as Shaman
 Lee Tae-hyung as Lee Jin-seok
 Jung Jae-kwang as Eun-sung
 Cha Joon as Bu-jjang
  as Police Chief
 Kim Seo-hwi as Yu-ra, Eun-shil's daughter
 Park Jung-min as Section Chief Park
  as Senior Reporter
 Jang Se-ah as Hospital Nurse
  as Hwa-ran

Special appearances
 Jung Hee-tae as homeless man
  as Cheon Jae-soon

Second season
OCN confirmed that Save Me will return for a second season. This time, it will be based on the 2013 animated film The Fake. Save Me 2 premiered on May 8, 2019.

Original soundtrack

Part 1

Part 2

Part 3

Ratings
 In this table,  represent the lowest ratings and  represent the highest ratings.
 N/A denotes that the rating is not known.

Awards and nominations

Notes

References

External links
  

 Save Me at Studio Dragon 
 Save Me at Hidden Sequence 

OCN television dramas
Korean-language television shows
2017 South Korean television series debuts
Television series about cults
Television series by Studio Dragon
Television series by Hidden Sequence
South Korean thriller television series
South Korean mystery television series
2017 South Korean television series endings
Television shows based on South Korean webtoons